Dalneye Lyapino is a rural locality (a selo) in Latnenskoye Rural Settlement, Semiluksky District, Voronezh Oblast, Russia. The population was 247 as of 2010. There are 2 streets.

Geography 
Dalneye Lyapino is located on the Gnilusha River, 14 km southwest of Semiluki (the district's administrative centre) by road. Latnaya is the nearest rural locality.

References 

Rural localities in Semiluksky District